Cambridge, Corpus Christi College, MS 303 (CCCC 303) is a twelfth-century English manuscript in the library of Corpus Christi College, Cambridge. The codex consists mostly of homilies, most of which derive from Ælfric of Eynshams Catholic Homilies. The manuscript is especially notable since it contains part of Ælfric's Judith.

Contents
Texts by Ælfric:
Catholic Homilies (CH) I.33, pp. 297–83
CH I.35, pp. 283–90
Lives of the Saints XVI, pp. 290–96
De duodecim abusiuis, 296-301
De doctrina apostolica (Pope XIX), pp. 301–6
De falsis diis (Pope XX.1-140, 150-2969, 299-301, 304-514, 565-676), pp. 306–17
Interrogationes Sigewulfi, pp. 317–27
Lives of the Saints XII, pp. 327–33
Lives of the Saints XIII, pp. 333–38
Judith (Assman IX.1-393), pp. 356–62

References
Notes

Bibliography
{{cite book |last1=Fox |first1=Michael |editor1-first=Fox |editor1-last=Michael |others=Manish Sharma |title=Old English Literature and the Old Testament |year=2012 |publisher=U of Toronto P |location=Toronto |isbn=9780802098542 |pages=25–63 |chapter=Ælfric's Interrogationes Sigewulfi}}
M.R. James. A Descriptive Catalogue of the Manuscripts of Corpus Christi College, Cambridge''. Vol 1. 1912.

12th-century manuscripts
Manuscripts of Corpus Christi College, Cambridge